György Matolcsy (born 18 July 1955, Budapest) is a Hungarian politician and economist, current governor of the Hungarian National Bank (MNB). He also served as Minister of Economy (2000–2002) during the first cabinet of Viktor Orbán and Minister of National Economy (2010–2013) in the Second Orbán Cabinet.

Career
In 1977, he graduated from the Faculty of Economics of Corvinus University of Budapest, at that time known as the Karl Marx University of Economics and Industry, and in 1981 received a PhD in economics from the same institution, the only university in Hungary before the fall of Communism where one could graduate from economics. He worked as an expert in economic institutions.
	
In 1990 he became for a brief period of parliamentary secretary in the Prime Minister József Antall period. In 1991-1994 he was a representative of the Hungarian Government, the European Bank for Reconstruction and Development in London, including a deputy director in the period 1991-1994, and in 1994 director of the bank. After returning to the country was among others Fidesz's economic expert, member of the National Assembly, and in 2000-2002, minister of economy. In 2003 he joined the Fidesz. On 29 May 2010 he became minister of national economy in the second Orbán cabinet.

He said in October 2011 the return to talks with IMF would be a "clear sign of weakness". He also said in the Parliament on 14 November 2011, just four days before the ministry's announcement, in a response to a Jobbik politician, "the government forming its economic policy against this three-letter institution [IMF]."

On 17 November 2011 the Ministry of National Economy said "government is starting negotiations on a new type of cooperation with the International Monetary Fund (IMF) in the course of scheduled consultations."

On 1 March 2013, Prime Minister Orbán nominated Matolcsy to the position of the Head of the Hungarian National Bank (MNB). Orbán said "performance and the facts point towards one man, and that is György Matolcsy." The Hungarian forint had steadily dropped when became official information that Matolcsy will be appointed governor. He took the office on 4 March, replacing András Simor.
	
He is the author of publications in the field of economics. The book, entitled Economic Balance and Growth, was published on 5 March 2015 and was translated and published in English in December 2015. It is the first of the Magyar Nemzeti Bank's book series.

Criticism
Numerous economists and banking experts have been critical of Matolcsy's unorthodox actions regarding the Hungarian National Bank's monetary policy, including former World Bank director Lajos Bokros and Raiffeisen Bank (Hungary) former CEO Péter Felcsuti. In an English language interview with Hungarian news website The Budapest Beacon, Bokros criticized Matolcsy for being a political appointee who knows nothing about monetary economics. Felcsuti said of Matolcsy, "To suggest that he is a lunatic wouldn’t be fair. He has a view which is basically very critical of the neoliberal economic school. It’s very Keynesian. He doesn't believe in the market and he believes much more in the government that guides or directs the market. I’ll say that much about him. These are things that can be said within the frame of academic debate."

In 2019 the Supreme Court of Hungary ruled that there was sufficient factual basis that accusing György Matolcsy of stealing public money did not constitute libel.

References

External links
MTI ki kicsoda 2009, Magyar Távirati Iroda Zrt., Budapest 2008, 729. old. 
Matolcsy's infopage at the Hungarian Parliament's portal
Biography at the Fidesz party's portal
Biography from the Origo news portal from 1999

1955 births
Living people
Hungarian economists
Governors of the Hungarian National Bank
Government ministers of Hungary
Fidesz politicians
Members of the National Assembly of Hungary (2006–2010)
Members of the National Assembly of Hungary (2010–2014)
Politicians from Budapest
Corvinus University of Budapest alumni